The 2015 Yuen Long District Council election was held on 22 November 2015 to elect all 35 elected members to the 41-member Yuen Long District Council.

Overall election results
Before election:

Change in composition:

References

External links
 Election Results - Overall Results

2015 Hong Kong local elections